Muhammad Gul (born 4 May 1959) is a Pakistani wrestler. He competed in the men's freestyle 74 kg at the 1984 Summer Olympics.

References

External links
 

1959 births
Living people
Pakistani male sport wrestlers
Olympic wrestlers of Pakistan
Wrestlers at the 1984 Summer Olympics
Place of birth missing (living people)